The 1923–24 Fall River F.C. season was the third season for the club in the American Soccer League. The club claimed the double by winning the ASL championship and the National Challenge Cup and was one game away from a treble losing the American Cup final to Bethlehem Steel F.C.

American Soccer League

Pld = Matches played; W = Matches won; D = Matches drawn; L = Matches lost; GF = Goals for; GA = Goals against; Pts = Points

National Challenge Cup

American Football Association Cup

Notes and references
Bibliography

Footnotes

Fall River F.C.
American Soccer League (1921–1933) seasons
Fall River F.C.